Hockey 9s or Hockey Nines is a variation of the sport of field hockey played at international level.  While played on a standard size hockey field, there are a number of variations in its rules, most significantly the reduction of number of players on a team from eleven to nine.

Rules and field variations
Teams are limited to nine players on the field at one time.  A match consists of two 15-minute halves, plus multiple golden goal periods of 5 minutes to resolve ties.  The game is played on a standard field hockey pitch, the goals are wider than those in eleven-a-side  hockey.

History
The nine-a-side game has been played at club level.

International Hockey 9s tournaments
 there have been three Hockey 9s tournaments contested by national representative teams.

The inaugural tournament was played in Perth, Western Australia in October 2011.  The Australia men's national field hockey team defeated the New Zealand men's national field hockey team in the final by 5 goals to 3.

 the third international Hockey 9s tournament is being played in Perth.

See also
Indoor hockey

References

External links
 International Super Series Hockey 9s website hosted by Hockey Australia

Team sports
Variations of field hockey